Naphtholactam is an organic compound derived from naphthalene.  It is a tricyclic species consisting of a naphthalene core fused with a lactam (NH-CO-) at the 1,8-positions.  The N-alkyl derivatives are commercially important.

Dye precursor
It is a precursor to the dye anthanthrone via ring-opening to the amino carboxylic acid, which can be converted to the diazonium salt.  Naphthostyril derivatives are also of interest in medicinal chemistry.  Naphthostyrils can be produced by metal-catalyzed cyclization of 1-naphthylamides.

N-Ethylnaphtholactam and related derivatives are precursors to many dyes. The lactam condenses with anilines in the presence of phosphorus oxychloride.

References

Naphthalenes
Gamma-lactams
Nitrogen heterocycles
Heterocyclic compounds with 3 rings